Ivlevo is a rural locality (a village) in Kolokshanskoye Rural Settlement, Sobinsky District, Vladimir Oblast, Russia. The population was 14 as of 2010.

Geography 
Ivlevo is located on the Klyazma River, 19 km northeast of Sobinka (the district's administrative centre) by road. Baranniki is the nearest rural locality.

References 

Rural localities in Sobinsky District